June 21 - Eastern Orthodox Church calendar - June 23

All fixed commemorations below celebrated on July 5 by Orthodox Churches on the Old Calendar.

For June 22nd, Orthodox Churches on the Old Calendar commemorate the Saints listed on June 9.

Saints
 Martyrs Zeno and his servant Zenas, of Philadelphia in Arabia (Amman) (304)
 Martyrs Galacteon and Pompeian, by drowning, in Petra, Constantinople.
 Martyrs Juliana and her son Saturninus, by fire, in Petra, Constantinople.
 Hieromartyr Eusebius of Samosata, Bishop of Samosata (380)
 St. Athanasius, Bishop of Chytri on Cyprus (4th century)
 1,480 martyrs of Samaria (Sebasteia) in Palestine (c. 615)
 Saint Basil, Abbot of Patalaria Monastery (8th-9th centuries)

Pre-Schism Western saints
 Saint Flavius Clemens, Flavius Clemens, brother of the Emperor Vespasian and uncle of Titus and Domitian, he was beheaded for the Orthodox Faith (c. 96)
 Saint Alban, protomartyr of Britain, in the Roman city of Verulamium (modern St Albans) (304)  (see also: June 20 )
 St. Paulinus the Merciful, Bishop of Nola (431)
 Saint John I of Naples, Bishop of Naples in Italy (5th century)
 Saint Aaron of Aleth (Aihran, Eran), hermit, monk and abbot at a monastery on Cézembre, a small island near Aleth, opposite Saint-Malo in Brittany, France (c.552) 
 Saint Consortia, founder of a convent in France endowed by King Clotaire after she miraculously healed his dying daughter; she was venerated at Cluny (c. 570)
 Saint John IV of Naples, known as 'the Peacemaker', he was Bishop of Naples in Italy, where he is venerated as a patron-saint (835)
 Saint Rotrudis, kinswoman of Charlemagne, a saint whose relics were enshrined at Saint Bertin in Saint-Omer, France (c. 869)
 Venerable Virgin-martyr Æbbe the Younger of Coldingham, Abbess of Coldingham Priory in south-east Scotland, and those with her (870)  (see also: April 2 )

Post-Schism Orthodox saints
 Saint Gregory, Metropolitan of Wallachia (1834)

New martyrs and confessors
 New Hieromartyr Gennadius, Priest (1918)
 New Hieromartyrs Theodore Smirnov and Gabriel Archangelsky, Deacons (1938)
 New Hieromartyr Michael Stephanovsky.

Other commemorations
 Repose of Righteous Mary the Cave-digger, of White Mountain Monastery near Voronezh (1822)
 Repose of Hieromonk Andrew, slain at Comana, Georgia (1993)

Icon gallery

Notes

References

Sources
 June 22/July 5. Orthodox Calendar (PRAVOSLAVIE.RU).
 July 5 / June 22. HOLY TRINITY RUSSIAN ORTHODOX CHURCH (A parish of the Patriarchate of Moscow).
 June 22. OCA - The Lives of the Saints.
 The Autonomous Orthodox Metropolia of Western Europe and the Americas (ROCOR). St. Hilarion Calendar of Saints for the year of our Lord 2004. St. Hilarion Press (Austin, TX). p. 46.
 The Twenty-Second Day of the Month of June. Orthodoxy in China.
 June 22. Latin Saints of the Orthodox Patriarchate of Rome.
 The Roman Martyrology. Transl. by the Archbishop of Baltimore. Last Edition, According to the Copy Printed at Rome in 1914. Revised Edition, with the Imprimatur of His Eminence Cardinal Gibbons. Baltimore: John Murphy Company, 1916. pp. 181–182.
 Rev. Richard Stanton. A Menology of England and Wales, or, Brief Memorials of the Ancient British and English Saints Arranged According to the Calendar, Together with the Martyrs of the 16th and 17th Centuries. London: Burns & Oates, 1892. pp. 281–284.
Greek Sources
 Great Synaxaristes:  22 ΙΟΥΝΙΟΥ. ΜΕΓΑΣ ΣΥΝΑΞΑΡΙΣΤΗΣ.
  Συναξαριστής. 22 Ιουνίου. ECCLESIA.GR. (H ΕΚΚΛΗΣΙΑ ΤΗΣ ΕΛΛΑΔΟΣ). 
  22 Ιουνίου. Αποστολική Διακονία της Εκκλησίας της Ελλάδος (Apostoliki Diakonia of the Church of Greece).
  22/06/2018. Ορθόδοξος Συναξαριστής. 
Russian Sources
  5 июля (22 июня). Православная Энциклопедия под редакцией Патриарха Московского и всея Руси Кирилла (электронная версия). (Orthodox Encyclopedia - Pravenc.ru).
  22 июня по старому стилю / 5 июля по новому стилю. Русская Православная Церковь - Православный церковный календарь на 2017 год.
  22 июня (ст.ст.) 5 июля 2014 (нов. ст.). Русская Православная Церковь Отдел внешних церковных связей. (DECR).

June in the Eastern Orthodox calendar